Coast Guard Station Cobb Island ( Cobb Island Station) is a former United States Coast Guard Station that was built on the southern end of Cobb Island, Virginia, one of Virginia's Barrier Islands, on Virginia's Eastern Shore, in 1936, to replace an earlier c. 1877 Coast Guard Station that had been damaged by a hurricane. The Coast Guard decommissioned Station Cobb Island in 1964. The Nature Conservancy (TNC) acquired the abandoned former Station Cobb Island in 1973. TNC moved the buildings comprising the former Station Cobb Island, by barge, eight miles across Cobb Island Bay, to a newly prepared site in Oyster, Northampton County, Virginia, on Virginia's Eastern Shore, in May 1998.  TNC subsequently restored the former Station Cobb Island as a nature education center/lodge/conference center through adaptive reuse. The property is currently listed for sale.

History

United States Coast Guard (c.1875/1936–1964)

Nathan F. Cobb, Sr. of Eastham, Massachusetts, came to Northampton County, Virginia. in October 1837, where he opened a store on the seaside road. In 1839 he purchased Sand Shoals Island, an uninhabited barrier island south of the Great Machipongo Inlet now known as Cobb Island, for a $100 cash down payment and a two-horse wagon-load of salt to be delivered later.  Cobb had a large home framed-up on Cape Cod and brought down to the barrier island by ship where he erected it and immediately opened his island as a public resort.  Eventually, Cobb constructed a hotel that catered to wealthy sportsmen from the northeast who traveled to the barrier island to hunt waterfowl and fish, and built a small town with a number of summer cottages and a church. In addition to running the hotel Cobb and his sons Nathan, Jr., Warren and Albert made a living market hunting and salvaging the many wrecked ships that stranded off Cobb Island.

The Cobbs were known for saving the lives of many shipwrecked sailors, therefore in 1875, the United States Life-Saving Service commissioned a lifesaving station on Cobb's Island.  Only a couple of years after it was completed the station burned to the ground and a second station was built to replace it.  Coast Guard Station Cobb Island was built by the United States Coast Guard on the southern end of Cobb Island in 1936 to replace the second c.1877 station that was damaged by the storm surge from the 1933 Chesapeake–Potomac hurricane that swept across the low lying barrier island.

By the 1930s Coast Guardsmen manning Station Cobb Island were the only permanent residents of Cobb Island.  The Cobbs and all other residents had moved to the mainland more than three decades earlier after the 1896 Hurricane destroyed the hotel and much of the town.  The architecture style of the new station was Colonial Revival, as designed by the Coast Guard’s Civil Engineer’s office.
 During its 89 year existence Coast Guard Station Cobb Island responded to twenty-four major shipwrecks. Station Cobb Island was decommissioned by the Coast Guard in 1964 and abandoned leaving Cobb Island uninhabited.

The Nature Conservancy (TNC) (1973–2006)

The Nature Conservancy (TNC) acquired the former Station Cobb Island from the U.S. Government in 1973., included as part of TNC's Virginia Coast Reserve (VCR). By the 1990s the former Coast Guard station was threatened by shoreline erosion and TNC made the decision to move the historic building from Cobb Island to the mainland to save it from destruction. In early May 1998, Expert Construction and House Movers, a Virginia Beach, Virginia, based commercial company contracted by TNC, lifted the three-story former Coast Guard station building onto a barge. On May 6, 1998, they towed the barge eight miles across Cobb Island Bay to a newly prepared site in Oyster, Northampton County, Virginia, on Virginia's Eastern Shore. On May 7, 1998, the building was unloaded from the barge and moved on land to a newly prepared site. An associated boathouse had also been moved by barge to the newly prepared new site at an earlier date. TNC subsequently restored the former Station Cobb Island as a nature education center/lodge/conference center. A Keeper’s cottage and other secondary buildings were subsequently added to complement the original Station.

World Healing Institute (2006 – c. 2011)

The former Station Cobb Island was acquired by Cobb Island Station LLC from The Nature Conservancy, c. 2006. The property was leased as a retreat center by the World Healing Institute until 2011.

Property for sale (2018)

The property, including the restored buildings and structures comprising the former Station Cobb Island, is currently (2018) listed for sale. The property is 32.3 acres. Included are: 17 acres of tidal salt marsh, 4 acres of intertidal emergent and scrub/shrub wetlands, and 5 acres of high ground and forest.

Kagawa, Ron M. and J. Richard Kellam. Cobb's Island, Virginia: The Last Sentinel. Virginia Beach, Virginia: The Donning Company Publishers, 2003

This publication examines the history of Cobb's Island, Virginia. Chapter 3: "Transformations: The Cobb's Island Life-Saving Stations", pp. 27–119, details the history of Cobb Island's two life-saving stations. This includes the planning for the move of the 1936 Coast Guard Station to the mainland, the move in May 1998, and the subsequent restoration of the former Coast Guard Station's buildings.

"…As part of Shore Financial Corporation's ongoing commitment to the Eastern Shore, we are proud to sponsor the effort to preserve the history, heritage, and traditions of our community. We are pleased that the proceeds of this book will benefit the Eastern Shore of Virginia Chamber of Commerce…"

References

External links
The National Trust for Historic Preservation: Historic Properties For Sale. Former Coast Guard Station Cobb Island (Current real estate listing)
Former Coast Guard Station Cobb Island. Real estate listing by Jos. T. Samuels, Inc. Realtors, Charlottesville, Virginia (Current real estate listing)
Former Coast Guard Station Cobb Island. Real Estate listing by Jos. T. Samuels, Inc. Realtors, Charlottesville, Virginia (Current real estate listing) (Virtual tour)
Former Coast Guard Station Cobb Island. Real Estate listing by Jos. T. Samuels, Inc. Realtors, Charlottesville, VA. LV Luxe Virginia (Current real estate listing)
Cobb Island Station For Sale. Samuels Virginia Real Estate. Published on July 22, 2016. Video produced from a drone in an aerial flyover. (YouTube video - 3 minutes:10 seconds)
Cobb Island Coast Guard Station | Facebook
Coast Guard Station Cobb Island - Local Business | Facebook
The Nature Conservancy (TNC). Virginia: Eastern Shore: The Virginia Coast Reserve (VCR) (Cobb Island)
Brownsville Preserve, a 1,250-acre nature preserve and historic farm on the Virginia Eastern Shore. TNC's Virginia Coast Reserve (VCR) is headquartered at Brownsville. Facebook
The Nature Conservancy (TNC). Virginia Barrier Island Beach Nesting Bird Brochure. 2012 (Includes map with Oyster, Virginia, and Virginia's Barrier Islands with Cobb Island)
Eastern Shore of Virginia National Wildlife Refuge
U.S. Life-Saving Service Heritage Association: Former Coast Guard Stations for Sale: Cobb Island, Virginia; Oyster, Virginia (Photos of Cobb Island Station, c. 1936-1964; c. 1998+)
Carol Vaughn, "Oyster: A delicacy, a community's way of life, Nov. 9, 2014, Delmarvanow ("…Cobb Island Station also is close by. The former Coast Guard station was moved to property off Oyster harbor by The Nature Conservancy in 1998. Now owned by Cobb Island Station LLC, it was leased as a retreat center until 2011, then was listed for sale, and is now off the market again…")
"In Oyster, Va., a Coast Guard Pearl". By Marianne Kyriakos. Special to The Washington Post, Sat., Aug. 26, 2006 (Article on property for sale in 2006)
"Former station of Coast Guard on the market for $5 million", The Virginian-Pilot, May 28, 2006 (Article on property for sale in 2006)
"Old Coast Guard Station Relocated", The Washington Post, FINAL Edition, METRO Section, May 7, 1998, page D.03 (ProQuest Newspaper Archiver Service)
National Register of Historic Places (NRHP) Multiple Property Documentation Form. Name of Multiple Property Listing: U.S. Government Lifesaving Stations, Houses of Refuge, and pre-1950 U.S. Coast Guard Lifeboat Stations ("…1875 Cobb Island, VA…")
National Park Service. U.S. Department of the Interior. Historic Architecture Program Northeast Region. U.S. Coast Guard Nauset Station Dwelling and Boathouse. Historic Structure Report. Cape Cod National Seashore, Barnstable County, Massachusetts. By Lance Kasparian, Historical Architect, Jan. 2008 (Page 264: "…20. Cobb Island, VA (1936). Oyster, VA 23419 Owned by: Virginia Coast Reserve, The Nature Conservancy, Nassawadox, VA…Moved to Oyster, VA, and renovated by The Nature Conservancy in 1999"… Photo of Cobb Island Station, c. 1936-1964)
U.S. Coast Guard History Program: Coast Guard Facilities & Stations: Historical Bibliography: Articles. Badger, Curtis J. "Cobb Island Station", The Nature Conservancy of Virginia: Virginia News (Spring 2002), pp. 14–15
U.S. Coast Guard History Program: Life-Saving Service & Coast Guard Stations. Historic Lifesaving & Other Shore Stations. East Coast/Gulf Coast. Virginia. Cobb Island
U.S. Coast Guard History Program: Station Cobb Island, Virginia. Also referred to as Cobb's Island. USLSS Station #10, Fifth District Coast Guard Station #157
"Cobb Island", U.S. Coast Guard Magazine, June 1936, Vol. 9, #8, p. 20 (One of a series of articles relating to the history and development of Coast Guard aviation)
Badger, Curtis J. and Rick Kellam. The Barrier Islands: A Photographic History of Life on Hogg, Cobb, Smith, Cedar, Parramore, Metompkin & Assateague. Harrisburg, Pennsylvania: Stackpole Books, 1989. Google Books (Chapter 1: Cobb Island, pp. 1–27. Photographs of c. 1877 and 1936 Cobb Island Life-Saving Stations: p. 23, 25-27)
Kagawa, Ron M. and J. Richard Kellam. Cobb's Island, Virginia: The Last Sentinel. Virginia Beach, Virginia: The Donning Company Publishers, 2003. Kenrick A. Claflin & Son ("…the authors trace the work of the life-savers on the island, and particularly the history of the 1875-76 life-saving station and later Coast Guard stations there,  their modifications over the years and finally moving of the Coast Guard station in its entirety to the mainland between 1997-2001…")
Anheuser–Busch Coastal Research Center biological field station, Oyster, Virginia, operated by the University of Virginia (New facility dedicated Aug. 26, 2006)
Eastern Shore of Virginia Barrier Islands Center, Machipongo, Northampton County, Virginia (copies of the following publication are available at the gift shop: Kagawa, Ron M. and J. Richard Kellam. Cobb's Island, Virginia: The Last Sentinel. Virginia Beach, Virginia: The Donning Company Publishers, 2003)

Eastern Shore of Virginia
United States Coast Guard stations
Government buildings completed in 1936
Buildings and structures in Northampton County, Virginia